The Queensland Derby is a Brisbane Racing Club Group 1  Thoroughbred horse race for three-year-olds at, set weights, run over a distance of 2400 metres at Eagle Farm Racecourse, Brisbane, Australia in June during the Queensland Winter Racing Carnival.  Total prize money is A$1,000,000.

Due to track reconstruction of Eagle Farm Racecourse for the 2014–15 racing season, the event was transferred to Doomben Racecourse with a shorter distance of 2200 metres.

History
The race was first run at the Gayndah Racecourse in 1868, before moving to Eagle Farm in 1871.

 Race was held twice in 1870, Grafton winning both runnings.

Venue
 2015 - Doomben Racecourse
 2017 - Doomben Racecourse 2200m

Winners

 2022 - Pinarello
 2021 - Kukeracha
 2020 - ‡race not held
2019 - Mr Quickie
2018 - Dark Dream
2017 - Ruthven
2016 - Eagle Way
2015 - Magicool
2014 - Sonntag
2013 - Hawkspur
2012 - Brambles
2011 - Shootoff
2010 - Dariana
2009 - Court Ruler
2008 - Riva San
2007 - Empires Choice
2006 - Ice Chariot
2005 - Lachlan River
2004 - Toulouse Lautrec
2003 - Half Hennessy
2002 - County Tyrone
2001 - De Gaulle Lane
2000 - Freemason
1999 - Camarena
1998 - Dodge
1997 - Yippyio
1996 - Valance
1995 - Turridu
1994 - Tenor
1993 - Air Seattle
1992 - Royal Magic
1991 - Dorset Downs
1990 - Rough Habit
1989 - Hidden Rhythm
1988 - Bravery
1987 - Princess Gracious
1986 - Handy Proverb
1985 - Tristina
1984 - Librici
1983 - Strawberry Road
1982 - Our Planet
1981 - Mr. Cromwell
1980 - Kingston Town
1979 - Double Century
1978 - Lefroy
1977 - Florissa
1976 - Cheyne Walk
1975 - Bottled Sunshine
1974 - Count Rapier
1973 - Analie
1972 - race not held
1971 - Amby's Love
1970 - Silver Sharpe
1969 - Intrepid Clipper
1968 - Tails
1967 - Minto Crag
1966 - Dark Briar
1965 - Bahram Star
1964 - Royal Sovereign
1963 - Confidence
1962 - Honest Man
1961 - Raajpoot
1960 - Persian Lyric
1959 -Travel Boy
1958 - Earlwood
1957 - Tulloch
1956 - Book Link
1955 - Regal Dignity
1954 - The Wash
1953 - Castillo
1952 - Headstockman
1951 - Forest Beau
1950 - Basha Felika
1949 - Pocket Money
1948 - Blue Slipper
1947 - Sefiona
1946 - Te Tana
1942–45 - race not held
1941 - Lord Spear
1940 - Fearless Fox
1939 - Spearace
1938 - Hendra Lad
1937 - Spear Chief
1936 - Six Fifty
1935 - Auto Buz
1934 - Glen's Spear
1933 - Waikare
1932 - Braeburn
1931 - Lough Neagh
1930 - Monash Valley
1929 - Bernfield
1928 - Paddi Eve
1927 - High Syce
1926 - Kitty Paddington
1925 - Wee Glen
1924 - Serelot
1923 - Ardglen
1922 - Kingslot
1921 - Lawn Mower
1920 - Seremist
1919 - Boy Syce
1918 - Syce Lad
1917 - Symposium
1916 - Lord Acre
1915 - Rascasse
1914 - Fog Bell
1913 - Signal Lamp
1912 - King Cleo
1911 - Maritoria
1910 - Persian Jewel
1909 - Braw Laddie
1908 - Flaxen
1907 - Euroa
1906 - Togo
1905 - Alexis
1904 - Joyance
1903 - Fitz Grafton
1902 - Balfour
1901 - Narelle
1900 - Musket
1899 - Master Bernie
1898 - Boreas II
1897 - The Guard
1896 - Greyleg
1895 - Black Diamond
1894 - Czarina
1893 - Triton
1892 - Tridentate
1891 - Splendide
1890 - Garuda
1889 - Fernando
1888 - Greywing
1887 - Lord Headington
1886 - Fano
1885 - Elbe
1884 - Petronel
1883 - Wheatmeat
1882 - Goldfinder
1881 - Legerdemain
1880 - Waterloo
1879 - Elastic
1878 - Whisker
1873–77 - race not held
1872 - J.L.
1871 - Florence
1870 - Grafton
1870 - Grafton
1869 - Zambesi
1868 - Hermit

‡ Not held because of the COVID-19 pandemic in Australia

See also
 List of Australian Group races
 Group races

References

Group 1 stakes races in Australia
Flat horse races for three-year-olds